Manuel Carballo may refer to:

 Manuel Carballo (gymnast) (born 1982), Spanish artistic gymnast
 Manuel Carballo (epidemiologist), epidemiologist 
 Manuel Carballo (athlete) (born 1948), Spanish sprinter, see Spain at the 1972 Summer Olympics
 Manuel Carballo (director), Spanish film director, see Exorcismus